Ahmed Shahdad (Arabic:أحمد شهداد) (born 1 January 1982) is a Qatari footballer.

References

External links
 

Qatari footballers
1982 births
Living people
Al Ahli SC (Doha) players
Al-Arabi SC (Qatar) players
Muaither SC players
Qatar Stars League players
Qatari Second Division players
Association football defenders